Darband-e Golriz (also Romanized as Darband-e Golrīz; also known as Kalāteh-ye Darband and Darband) is a village in Takab Rural District, in the Central District of Dargaz County, Razavi Khorasan Province, Iran. At the 2006 census, its population was 16, in 4 families.

References 

Populated places in Dargaz County